This is a list of the Sites of Special Scientific Interest (SSSIs) in the Cardiff Area of Search (AoS).

History
This Area of Search was formed from parts of the previous AoS of Mid & South Glamorgan.

Sites
 
 Castell Coch Woodlands and Road Section
 Coed y Bedw
 Ely Valley
 Fforestganol a Chwm Nofydd
 Flat Holm
 Garth Wood
 Long Wood (Glamorganshire Canal local nature reserve)
 Gwent Levels - Rumney
 Lisvane Reservoir
 Llanishen and Lisvane Reservoir Embankments
 Penylan Quarry
 Rhymney River Section
 Rumney Quarry
 Severn Estuary
 Ty Du Moor

See also
 List of SSSIs by Area of Search

References

Cardiff
Cardiff